Mieczysław Ożóg (born 23 February 1966) is a Polish midfielder who plays for Bukowa Jastkowice. He is one of the oldest players playing in Polish football, albeit not in the top league.

He played in Ekstraklasa as a footballer of Stal Stalowa Wola and Siarka Tarnobrzeg.

External links
 

1966 births
Living people
Polish footballers
Stal Stalowa Wola players
Siarka Tarnobrzeg players
Górnik Łęczna players
Pogoń Staszów players
Place of birth missing (living people)
Association football midfielders